The Oratory of Gesù Pellegrino, also called the Oratorio dei Pretoni, is a Roman Catholic prayer hall or small church found on the corner of Via San Gallo and via degli Arazzieri in Florence, region of Tuscany, Italy.

History

Formerly the church of San Salvatore, it belonged to the confraternity of that name, until in 1313 the bishop Antonio d’Orso instituted a hospice for pilgrim priests. The church was later dedicated to St James, and under the sainted Archbishop Antoninus, the confraternity set up a hospice for elderly priests.

In 1585 to 1588, commissioned by Alessandro de' Medici, restructuring was directed by Giovanni Antonio Dosio. In the interior are a fresco cycle and  three altarpieces with episodes from The Life of Christ (1590) by the mannerist painter Giovanni Balducci. On the counterfacade is a recently restored organ. In the nave close to the entrance is the tomb of a famous parish priest, Arlotto Mainardi (1396–1484).

Gallery of Frescoes by Giovanni Balducci

Sources
 Churches of Florence entry

External links

 Visit the Places of Faith in Tuscany: Search: Oratory of Gesu Pellegrino

Roman Catholic churches in Florence
16th-century Roman Catholic church buildings in Italy
Renaissance architecture in Florence